The 2010 Sheraton Hawaii Bowl was the ninth edition of the college football bowl game.  The game was played at Aloha Stadium in Honolulu on Friday of Christmas Eve 2010, at 8 p.m. ET. The contest was televised live on ESPN and sponsored by Sheraton Hotels and Resorts.  The game featured Tulsa of Conference USA versus Hawai'i of the Western Athletic Conference.

Teams

Hawai'i Warriors

The game marked Hawai'i's 6th appearance in the Hawai'i Bowl since its inception in 2002.  The invitation acceptance marked the earliest acceptance to a bowl game in the school's history.  The Warriors finished the regular season with a 10–3 record and a share of the WAC Conference Championship.  Although Hawai'i lost to co-champion Boise State they upset Nevada to become co-champions.  Hawaii quarterback Bryant Moniz threw for a nation-leading 4,629 yards with 36 touchdowns and 11 interceptions. Top receivers were senior slot receivers Greg Salas and Kealoha Pilares. The Warriors boasted the nation's 8th best team in terms of total offense.

Tulsa Golden Hurricane

Tulsa made their 3rd bowl appearance in coach Todd Graham's tenure with the team.  They entered the game with a 9–3 record which included a key victory over Notre Dame.  Overall, the Golden Hurricane won their last six games of the season.  Tulsa ranked number 5 in the country in total offense, averaging a total of 503.5 yards per game.  Tulsa was 2–0 in bowl games under Graham winning the GMAC Bowl following the 2007 and 2008 seasons. Junior quarterback G.J. Kinne was named offensive Player of the Year and junior Damaris Johnson was named the special teams Player of the Year in the Conference USA.

Game summary

Scoring

Statistics

Game notes
The game also marked the first meeting between Tulsa and Hawaii since 2004, the last year Tulsa was in the WAC before leaving for C-USA.  Overall Hawaii held a 5–3 advantage in the series.  This was the first time the two schools had met in a bowl game.
 Tulsa set a Hawai‘i Bowl record with the 62 points, the most points given up by a UH team since 2005 in a 63–17 loss to then No.1 USC.

References 

Hawaii Bowl
Hawaii Bowl
Hawaii Rainbow Warriors football bowl games
Tulsa Golden Hurricane football bowl games
2010 in sports in Hawaii
December 2010 sports events in the United States